Sharks Ice San Jose (formerly the Ice Center of San Jose, Logitech Ice Center, and Solar4AmericaIce) is an indoor ice rink in San Jose, California, United States. The largest ice rink facility in the Western United States, Solar4America Ice serves as the official training facility for the NHL San Jose Sharks and the home arena for San Jose State University's Spartans hockey team. The facility opened in 1994 and was expanded in 2000 and 2005. Roofing contractor PetersenDean bought naming rights to the facility in 2016, renaming the facility after its Solar4America solar roofing brand. After PetersenDean's bankruptcy in 2020, the name reverted to Sharks Ice

The venue is also used for public skating, public/private skating programs, hockey programs, broomball, curling, speed skating, ice dancing, and more.

Remodeled in the summer of 2005, the  facility features four (4) NHL-sized ice rinks (the Spartans play on the North Rink, which has a listed seating capacity of approximately 550, but is routinely packed with upwards of 1000 fans on game nights), as well as a full-service Pro Shop, a full-service Food Court, and meeting space for up to 500 guests.

Additionally, Stanley's Sports Bar & Grill, opened in January 2006, features food, beer, and wine.

In 1995, the arena hosted the Women's Pacific Rim Championship ice hockey tournament.

A proposed  expansion would add another two rink surfaces and more than double the size of the facility, but would displace the San Jose Municipal Firing Range. If the expansion is approved, it would begin construction in 2020 and finish in December 2021.

The facility expansion included the new Tech CU Arena, the permanent home of the San Jose Barracuda.

References

External links
 

Indoor ice hockey venues in California
Sports venues in San Jose, California
Sports venues in the San Francisco Bay Area
Sports venues completed in 2005
Educational institutions in the United States with year of establishment missing
College ice hockey venues in the United States
National Hockey League practice facilities